Stephan Leblanc (born January 20, 1986) is a former Canadian professional lacrosse player having played for the Toronto Rock, New England Black Wolves, Halifax Thunderbirds and Georgia Swarm in the National Lacrosse League. In November 2022, he announced is retirement as a player.

Leblanc was chosen by the Rock in the first round of the 2009 NLL entry draft, and joined the team along with fellow draft choice Garrett Billings in the 2010 season. He was named Rookie of the Month for both February and April, and after scoring 82 points in his rookie year, was named NLL Rookie of the Year.

In 2020, Leblanc became the second men's lacrosse player inducted into the Queens Athletics Hall of Fame.

Statistics

NLL
Reference:

Awards

References

1986 births
Living people
Canadian lacrosse players
Georgia Swarm players
Halifax Thunderbirds players
Lacrosse people from Ontario
National Lacrosse League major award winners
New England Black Wolves players
People from Dundas, Ontario
Queen's Golden Gaels players
Sportspeople from Hamilton, Ontario
Toronto Rock players